The 2009 Nordic Figure Skating Championships were held between February 6 and 8, 2009 at the Malmö Isstadion in Malmö, Sweden. They were a multi-national competition between skaters from Nordic countries. Skaters competed in the disciplines of men's singles and ladies' singles on the senior, junior, and novice levels.

Senior results

Men

Ladies

Junior results

Men

Ladies

Novice results

Boys

Girls

References

External links
 2009 Nordic Championships
 2009 Nordic Championships Results

Nordic Figure Skating Championships, 2009
Nordic Figure Skating Championships
International figure skating competitions hosted by Sweden
Nordic Figure Skating Championships